The Kolkata Municipal Corporation is divided into 144 administrative wards that are grouped into 16 boroughs. Each of these wards elects a councillor to the KMC. Each borough has a committee consisting of the councillors elected from the respective wards of the boroughs. The Corporation, through the borough committees, maintains government-aided schools, hospitals and municipal markets and partakes in urban planning and road maintenance.<ref
name=Metropolis></ref> The corporation as the apex body discharges its function through the Mayor-in-Council, consisting of a mayor, assisted by a deputy mayor, and ten other elected members of the KMC. The Councillors are responsible for the overall functioning of their respective wards and has a tenure of five years.

List of Wards
Ward No. 1, Kolkata Municipal Corporation 
Ward No. 2, Kolkata Municipal Corporation
Ward No. 3, Kolkata Municipal Corporation
Ward No. 4, Kolkata Municipal Corporation
Ward No. 5, Kolkata Municipal Corporation
Ward No. 6, Kolkata Municipal Corporation
Ward No. 7, Kolkata Municipal Corporation
Ward No. 8, Kolkata Municipal Corporation
Ward No. 9, Kolkata Municipal Corporation
Ward No. 10, Kolkata Municipal Corporation
Ward No. 11, Kolkata Municipal Corporation
Ward No. 12, Kolkata Municipal Corporation
Ward No. 13, Kolkata Municipal Corporation
Ward No. 14, Kolkata Municipal Corporation
Ward No. 15, Kolkata Municipal Corporation
Ward No. 16, Kolkata Municipal Corporation
Ward No. 17, Kolkata Municipal Corporation
Ward No. 18, Kolkata Municipal Corporation
Ward No. 19, Kolkata Municipal Corporation
Ward No. 20, Kolkata Municipal Corporation
Ward No. 21, Kolkata Municipal Corporation
Ward No. 22, Kolkata Municipal Corporation
Ward No. 23, Kolkata Municipal Corporation
Ward No. 24, Kolkata Municipal Corporation
Ward No. 25, Kolkata Municipal Corporation
Ward No. 26, Kolkata Municipal Corporation
Ward No. 27, Kolkata Municipal Corporation
Ward No. 28, Kolkata Municipal Corporation
Ward No. 29, Kolkata Municipal Corporation
Ward No. 30, Kolkata Municipal Corporation
Ward No. 31, Kolkata Municipal Corporation
Ward No. 32, Kolkata Municipal Corporation
Ward No. 33, Kolkata Municipal Corporation
Ward No. 34, Kolkata Municipal Corporation
Ward No. 35, Kolkata Municipal Corporation
Ward No. 36, Kolkata Municipal Corporation
Ward No. 37, Kolkata Municipal Corporation
Ward No. 38, Kolkata Municipal Corporation
Ward No. 39, Kolkata Municipal Corporation
Ward No. 40, Kolkata Municipal Corporation
Ward No. 41, Kolkata Municipal Corporation
Ward No. 42, Kolkata Municipal Corporation
Ward No. 43, Kolkata Municipal Corporation
Ward No. 44, Kolkata Municipal Corporation
Ward No. 45, Kolkata Municipal Corporation
Ward No. 46, Kolkata Municipal Corporation
Ward No. 47, Kolkata Municipal Corporation
Ward No. 48, Kolkata Municipal Corporation
Ward No. 49, Kolkata Municipal Corporation
Ward No. 50, Kolkata Municipal Corporation
Ward No. 51, Kolkata Municipal Corporation
Ward No. 52, Kolkata Municipal Corporation
Ward No. 53, Kolkata Municipal Corporation
Ward No. 54, Kolkata Municipal Corporation
Ward No. 55, Kolkata Municipal Corporation
Ward No. 56, Kolkata Municipal Corporation
Ward No. 57, Kolkata Municipal Corporation
Ward No. 58, Kolkata Municipal Corporation
Ward No. 59, Kolkata Municipal Corporation
Ward No. 60, Kolkata Municipal Corporation
Ward No. 61, Kolkata Municipal Corporation
Ward No. 62, Kolkata Municipal Corporation
Ward No. 63, Kolkata Municipal Corporation
Ward No. 64, Kolkata Municipal Corporation
Ward No. 65, Kolkata Municipal Corporation
Ward No. 66, Kolkata Municipal Corporation
Ward No. 67, Kolkata Municipal Corporation
Ward No. 68, Kolkata Municipal Corporation
Ward No. 69, Kolkata Municipal Corporation
Ward No. 70, Kolkata Municipal Corporation
Ward No. 71, Kolkata Municipal Corporation
Ward No. 72, Kolkata Municipal Corporation
Ward No. 73, Kolkata Municipal Corporation
Ward No. 74, Kolkata Municipal Corporation
Ward No. 75, Kolkata Municipal Corporation
Ward No. 76, Kolkata Municipal Corporation
Ward No. 77, Kolkata Municipal Corporation
Ward No. 78, Kolkata Municipal Corporation
Ward No. 79, Kolkata Municipal Corporation
Ward No. 80, Kolkata Municipal Corporation
Ward No. 81, Kolkata Municipal Corporation
Ward No. 82, Kolkata Municipal Corporation
Ward No. 83, Kolkata Municipal Corporation
Ward No. 84, Kolkata Municipal Corporation
Ward No. 85, Kolkata Municipal Corporation
Ward No. 86, Kolkata Municipal Corporation
Ward No. 87, Kolkata Municipal Corporation
Ward No. 88, Kolkata Municipal Corporation
Ward No. 89, Kolkata Municipal Corporation
Ward No. 90, Kolkata Municipal Corporation
Ward No. 91, Kolkata Municipal Corporation
Ward No. 92, Kolkata Municipal Corporation
Ward No. 93, Kolkata Municipal Corporation
Ward No. 94, Kolkata Municipal Corporation
Ward No. 95, Kolkata Municipal Corporation
Ward No. 96, Kolkata Municipal Corporation
Ward No. 97, Kolkata Municipal Corporation
Ward No. 98, Kolkata Municipal Corporation
Ward No. 99, Kolkata Municipal Corporation
Ward No. 100, Kolkata Municipal Corporation
Ward No. 101, Kolkata Municipal Corporation
Ward No. 102, Kolkata Municipal Corporation
Ward No. 103, Kolkata Municipal Corporation
Ward No. 104, Kolkata Municipal Corporation
Ward No. 105, Kolkata Municipal Corporation
Ward No. 106, Kolkata Municipal Corporation
Ward No. 107, Kolkata Municipal Corporation
Ward No. 108, Kolkata Municipal Corporation
Ward No. 109, Kolkata Municipal Corporation
Ward No. 110, Kolkata Municipal Corporation
Ward No. 111, Kolkata Municipal Corporation
Ward No. 112, Kolkata Municipal Corporation
Ward No. 113, Kolkata Municipal Corporation
Ward No. 114, Kolkata Municipal Corporation
Ward No. 115, Kolkata Municipal Corporation
Ward No. 116, Kolkata Municipal Corporation
Ward No. 117, Kolkata Municipal Corporation
Ward No. 118, Kolkata Municipal Corporation
Ward No. 119, Kolkata Municipal Corporation
Ward No. 120, Kolkata Municipal Corporation
Ward No. 121, Kolkata Municipal Corporation
Ward No. 122, Kolkata Municipal Corporation
Ward No. 123, Kolkata Municipal Corporation
Ward No. 124, Kolkata Municipal Corporation
Ward No. 125, Kolkata Municipal Corporation
Ward No. 126, Kolkata Municipal Corporation
Ward No. 127, Kolkata Municipal Corporation
Ward No. 128, Kolkata Municipal Corporation
Ward No. 129, Kolkata Municipal Corporation
Ward No. 130, Kolkata Municipal Corporation
Ward No. 131, Kolkata Municipal Corporation
Ward No. 132, Kolkata Municipal Corporation
Ward No. 133, Kolkata Municipal Corporation
Ward No. 134, Kolkata Municipal Corporation
Ward No. 135, Kolkata Municipal Corporation
Ward No. 136, Kolkata Municipal Corporation
Ward No. 137, Kolkata Municipal Corporation
Ward No. 138, Kolkata Municipal Corporation
Ward No. 139, Kolkata Municipal Corporation
Ward No. 140, Kolkata Municipal Corporation
Ward No. 141, Kolkata Municipal Corporation
Ward No. 142, Kolkata Municipal Corporation
Ward No. 143, Kolkata Municipal Corporation
Ward No. 144, Kolkata Municipal Corporation

References

Kolkata Municipal Corporation